Three ships have borne the name Consul Horn, all owned, for at least part of their career, by the German Shipping Company HC Horn:
1901–1928, SS Consul Horn, a  steam cargo ship built for HC Horn by Helsingör Jernskib & Maskinbyggeri. Seized by France during the First World War. Subsequently named Sampierdarena, Heinz Kayser, Lotte Leonhardt and Herrenwyk. Foundered in the Atlantic Ocean in 1928
1904−1942, SS Consul Horn, a  steam cargo ship previously called Mamari, Gerolstein and Consul, sunk by a mine of the coast of the Netherlands
1924−1959 MS Consul Horn a  diesel-powered cargo ship, later renamed Hindhead, Rio Negro and finally

References

Ship names